Grinham is a surname. Notable people with the surname include:

Fred Grinham (1881–1972), British-born American cyclist
James Grinham (christened 20 December 1798-death unknown), English amateur cricketer
Jodie Grinham (born 1993), British archer
Judy Grinham (born 1939), British competitive swimmer
Natalie Grinham (born 1978), Australian squash player
Rachael Grinham (born 1977), Australian squash player